Roman Vráblík (born January 15, 1990) is a Czech professional ice hockey defenseman. He is currently playing for Motor České Budějovice of the Czech Extraliga (ELH).

Vráblík made his Czech Extraliga debut playing with České Budějovice during the 2011–12 Czech Extraliga season.

References

External links

1990 births
Living people
Motor České Budějovice players
Czech ice hockey defencemen
Stadion Hradec Králové players
HC Plzeň players
Sportspeople from Písek